Julián Garcés, O.P. (Ordo Praedicatorum, "Dominican Order") was a Spanish Dominican priest born in Munébrega in the Kingdom of Aragon. Made Bishop in the Diocese of Yucatán in 1519 and subsequently first acting bishop of New Spain in the Diocese of Tlaxcala from 1525, he occupied his episcopal post between October 13, 1525, and his death, December 7, 1542.

Biography 
Garcés took the vows in the convent of the Orden de Santo Domingo in Calatayud. He studied at the University of Salamanca and the Sorbonne in Paris, then taught theology in the convent of Zaragoza, where he received his master's degree. He then studied philosophy, theology, and Latin in Paris. He was the royal chaplain of Charles I of Spain, V of the Holy Roman Empire and head of the Dominican Order in Aragon.

He was named bishop of the new diocese of Yucatán, in New Spain, the 1519 royal provision reading, "We present you (Rev. Father Julián Garcés) to the Bishopric of Yucatán and Santa María de los Remedios", having been recommended by Carlos's ecclesiastical advisers. However, with new information about the new territory's geography, in 1525, Pope Clement VII named him bishop of Tlaxcala, writing, "We grant you and the bishops who shall succeed you, that you call yourselves not bishops of Santa María (de los Remedios or of Yucatán) but 'Tenuxtitlan' and of other lands to be mentioned."

Garcés chose the city of Tlaxcala as his episcopal seat. Despite his old age, he did not hesitate in setting out for the West Indies, taking possession of his episcopal see two years later. In his time in the tlaxcalan bishopric, he stood out for his care taken in the protection of the natives, as well as the erection of temples and welfare services. The fruit of these endeavors was the construction of a hospital on the 'Camino de Veracruz' and of the cathedral of Puebla de los Ángeles, the name that his diocese would later adopt.

Garcés is one of the Aragonese who participated in the early missionary and colonial action of the Spanish Crown in New Spain, taking an active part in the controversy concerning the natives, the result of which was a letter to Pope Paul III in defense of the "Indios". He died in his see of a malarial fever at the age of 89.

Work 
Epístola ad SS. Dom. Nost. Paulum III Pontificem Maximum in Gratiam Indorum. Ilustratio omnium operum Divi Augustini, Notis marginalibus a se ipso factis.

Ilustratio omnium operum Divi Augustini, Notis marginalibus á se ipso factis

Papers concerning the establishment of the Church in Puebla de los Angeles, with reports of that City and its Diocese.

A collection of sermons

References

External links and additional sources
 Biografía del obispo Garcés
 (for Chronology of Bishops) 
 (for Chronology of Bishops) 
 (for Chronology of Bishops) 
 (for Chronology of Bishops) 

Spanish Dominicans
16th-century Roman Catholic bishops in Mexico
Spanish Roman Catholic bishops in North America
People from the Kingdom of Aragon
1452 births
1542 deaths
University of Salamanca alumni